WACA may refer to:

WACA (AM), a radio station (900 AM) licensed to Laurel, Maryland, United States
WDON (AM), a radio station (1540 AM) licensed to Wheaton, Maryland, which held the call sign WACA from 1997 to 2021
WACA Ground, a stadium in Perth, the home of the Western Australian Cricket Association
West African Court of Appeal, a British colonial appellate court
Waca Lake, a lake in the United States
Western Australian Cricket Association, Australian cricket governing body
Wide area circumferential ablation, a surgical procedure of the heart
World Affairs Councils of America, an American international affairs organization